Parategeticula tzoyatlella is a moth of the family Prodoxidae. It is found in the southern Mapimí area of the Chihuahuan Desert in Mexico.

The wingspan is 19–24 mm for males and 21-25.5 mm for females. Adults are on wing in March.

The larvae feed on Yucca rostrata and Yucca rigida.

Etymology
The species name is derived from tzoyatl, the Nahuatl name for Yucca rostrata.

References

Moths described in 2000
Prodoxidae